You Might Be a Zombie and Other Bad News: Shocking but Utterly True Facts is a New York Times bestselling book from the staff of Cracked.com, which is the most visited humor website in the world. Published in 2010 by Plume, the book is a crowdsourced effort led by Cracked.com's editorial staff and more than 2,500 contributors from all over the world.

Background
Cracked.com was founded in 2006 and currently receives over 300 million monthly page views. Cracked.com publishes at least one 2,000 – 3,000 word article every day of the week, most of which are read by over a million people. Their longtime editorial staff includes original editor-in-chief Jack O'Brien, David Wong who was added as an associate editor later in 2006, and Oren Katzeff who became Cracked.coms General Manager in November 2007 after running business development for Yahoo Media Group.Weinroth, Adam. Interview with a Zombie: Oren Katzeff of Cracked.com. Demand Media. December 28, 2010.

The title was inspired by one of Cracked.com'''s most popular articles called "5 Scientific Reasons a Zombie Apocalypse Could Actually Happen".Nunziata, Nick. Interview: Michael Swaim & Daniel O'Brien (You Might Be A Zombie). Chud. January 7, 2011. Michael Swaim, a Cracked writer, notes that "Cracked.com has really been built on tricking you into learning stuff and [the book] is just a very natural extension of that."

Synopsis
The comedy trivia book is composed of 38 articles, including 20 of the site's most popular articles. The additional 18 articles are exclusive to the book. The topics include the Zombie apocalypse, disgusting facts about bugs allowed in your food by the Food and Drug Administration, the secret menace that is dolphins, and other such facts. The book is written in Cracked.coms popular "listicle" format.Krangel, Eric. Cracked.com Taunts Ailing MAD Mag: Ever Hear Of The Internet? Business Insider. February 1, 2009.

Reviews and receptionYou Might Be a Zombie was profiled by The Huffington Post and Forbes, with an endorsement from Spider-Man and X-Men creator Stan Lee. The book was described as "Smart, funny, and cool" by critic Roger Ebert and comedian Sarah Silverman noted that there was "finally a book that will tell you the truth about the things you need to know."

The book reached #9 on The New York Times Best Seller list, #13 on The Los Angeles Times Best Seller list, and sold more than 40,000 copies. As part of the marketing campaign, Cracked.com encouraged fans to post pictures of themselves alongside the book with 50-word captions.Shields, Mike. Demand Media’s Unlikely Success Story. Digiday. October 14, 2011.

ContributorsYou Might Be a Zombie'' has over 2,500 contributors, including:

 Nathan Birch
 Robert Brockway
 Adam Tod Brown
 Tim Cameron
 Erica Cantin
 Rory Colthurst
 Travis Corkery
 S Peter Davis
 Jacopo della Quercia
 Ben Dennison
 Justin Droms
 Robert Evans
 Ian Fortey
 Alexandra Gedrose
 Gladstone
 Christina Hsu

 Peter Hildebrand
 David King
 Ben Joseph
 Richard Kane
 Jeff Kelly
 Stuart Layt
 Alex Levinton
 Daniel O'Brien
 Jack O'Brien
 Colm Prunty
 Tom Reimann
 Ned Resnikoff
 Levi Ritchie
 Seanbaby
 Michael Swaim
 Brian Thompson

 Brian Walton
 David Wong
 Winston Rowntree (illustrator)
 Anthony Clark (illustrator)
 Jordan Monsell (illustrator)
 Ben Driscoll (illustrator)
 Manuel Rebollo (illustrator)
 Shannon O'Brien (illustrator)
 Christopher Hastings (illustrator)
 Matt Barrs (illustrator)
 Brendan McGinley (illustrator)
 Brian Patrick (illustrator)
 Michael Swaim (illustrator)
 Randall Maynard (illustrator)

References

External links
 Cracked.com

Comedy books
2010 non-fiction books